John Onins Exley Jr. (May 23, 1867 in Philadelphia, Pennsylvania – July 27, 1938 in Milford, Delaware) was an American rower, born in Philadelphia, who competed in the 1900 Summer Olympics and in the 1904 Summer Olympics.

In 1900, he was part of the American boat Vesper Boat Club, which won the gold medal in the men's eight. Four years later, he won his second gold medal in the men's eight.

References

External links

1867 births
1938 deaths
Rowers from Philadelphia
Rowers at the 1900 Summer Olympics
Rowers at the 1904 Summer Olympics
Olympic gold medalists for the United States in rowing
American male rowers
Medalists at the 1904 Summer Olympics
Medalists at the 1900 Summer Olympics